Broom grass is a name used for different types of grass around the world.

In tropical Asia it refers to Thysanolaena maxima of the family Poaceae; a tall, <3m, grass which is used for making brooms.

In United States it refers to Andropogon glomeratus of the family  Poaceae, a tall grass, growing to about 2m high.